Blackpool is a settlement on Waiheke Island in northern New Zealand. It was named after Blackpool, which is a large town in England.

References

Populated places on Waiheke Island
Beaches of the Auckland Region